The 2015–16 Zenit Saint Petersburg season was the 91st season in the club's history and its 20th consecutive season in the Russian Premier League. The club also participated in the Russian Cup and the UEFA Champions League.

Squad

Out on loan

Reserve squad

Transfers

Summer

In:

Out:

Winter

In:

Out:

Competitions

Russian Premier League

Results by round

Matches

League table

Russian Super Cup

Russian Cup

Champions League

Group stage

Knockout phase

Round of 16

Squad statistics

Appearances and goals

|-
|colspan="14"|Players away from the club on loan:

|-
|colspan="14"|Players who appeared for Zenit but left during the season:

|}

Goal Scorers

Disciplinary record

References

FC Zenit Saint Petersburg seasons
Zenit Saint Petersburg
Zenit Saint Petersburg